Jørgen Åsland (born 1 November 1946) is a Norwegian politician for the Centre Party.

He served as a deputy representative to the Norwegian Parliament from Vest-Agder during the term 1993–1997.

On the local level he was the mayor of Åseral from 1991 to 2007. He was first elected to Åseral municipal council in 1979.

References
 

1946 births
Living people
Centre Party (Norway) politicians
Deputy members of the Storting
Mayors of places in Vest-Agder
Place of birth missing (living people)